Copelatus dolosus is a species of diving beetle. It is part of the genus Copelatus of the subfamily Copelatinae in the family Dytiscidae. It was described by Guignot in 1956.

References

dolosus
Beetles described in 1956